Sengekoven Cirque is a cirque indenting the north side of Breplogen Mountain immediately east of Hogsenga Crags, in the Muhlig-Hofmann Mountains of Queen Maud Land. Plotted from surveys and air photos by the Norwegian Antarctic Expedition (1956–60) and named Sengekoven (the bed closet).

Cirques of Queen Maud Land
Princess Astrid Coast